Wielka Nieszawka  is a village in Toruń County, Kuyavian-Pomeranian Voivodeship, in north-central Poland. It is the seat of the gmina (administrative district) called Gmina Wielka Nieszawka.

The village has a population of 460.

References

Wielka Nieszawka